Srednja Bela is a village in the Municipality of Preddvor in the Upper Carniola region of Slovenia.

The local church in the settlement is dedicated to Saint Giles.

References

External links

Srednja Bela at Geopedia.si

Populated places in the Municipality of Preddvor